Gihan de Silva (born 25 July 1985) is a Sri Lankan former first-class cricketer who played for Moors Sports Club. He made his Twenty20 debut on 17 August 2004, for Bloomfield Cricket and Athletic Club in the 2004 SLC Twenty20 Tournament.

References

External links
 

1985 births
Living people
Sri Lankan cricketers
Bloomfield Cricket and Athletic Club cricketers
Moors Sports Club cricketers
Cricketers from Colombo